Txe Arana (Lleida, Spain, 1972) is a Catalan actress and television hostess. She started her career in 1993 in the musical TV show Sputnik. She has also worked as a voice actor in many audiovisual productions, such as the II Premis Gaudí ceremony organised by the Catalan Film Academy on 1 February 2010. She is also a collaborator in the online magazine Esguard.

Txe Arana is a supporter of Catalan Independence, and she took part in a campaign to encourage participation in the 2014 Independence referendum.

Filmography

Television 
 1993: Sputnik (presenter)
 1993: Tres senyores i un senyor (presenter)
 1998–2000: Laberint d'ombres
 1999: Coses de la vida (presenter)
 2001: Temps de silenci (2 episodes)
 2005: El cor de la ciutat
 2007: Colors en sèrie (voice, episode "Vermell")
 2007: Un lloc per viure (voice, documentary)
 2009–2010: Ànima
 2010: Adéu, Espanya? (voice, documentary)
 2007– present: MIC, Televisió de Catalunya (voice-over)

Cinema 
 2008: Reality, short film by Kim Gázquez
 2009: Marcianas, short film by Sintu Amat
 2017: Barcelona 1714, by Anna M. Bofarull

External links 
  
 
 Catalan TV article

References 

Spanish voice actresses
Spanish television presenters
Spanish women television presenters
21st-century Spanish actresses
People from Lleida
Actresses from Catalonia
1972 births
20th-century Spanish actresses
Living people